The Art of Flight is a Red Bull sponsored documentary film about snowboarding and a successor to That's It, That's All. Directed by Curt Morgan, it premiered in New York City on September 8, 2011, at the Beacon Theatre.

Cast
 Travis Rice
 Mark Landvik
 John Jackson
 Nicolas Müller
 Scotty Lago
 Bjorn Leines
 David Carrier Porcheron "DCP"
 Jeremy Jones
 Pat Moore
 Eero Niemela
 Kyle Clancy
 Eric Willett
 Bode Merrill
 Jack Mitrani
 Luke Mitrani
 Mark McMorris
 Jake Blauvelt
 Lars "Koffer" Keser

Production
The Art of Flight was shot over the course of two years from 2009 to 2011.

It was filmed using the RED camera system, the GoPro Hero, Vision Research's Phantom Gold high speed camera, Panasonic Varicam HPX3700, Arri 235 (4 perf 35mm), Cineflex HD (Sony HDC-1500) and Nikon and Canon SLRs for time lapses.

Locations
 Nelson, British Columbia, Canada
 Revelstoke, British Columbia
 Patagonia, Chile
 Alaska
 Jackson, Wyoming
 Aspen, Colorado

Reception
Slant Magazine said, "even at 80 minutes, The Art of Flight feels severely empty, an aesthetic showcase whose repetitive nature winds up diminishing the excitement of its breathtaking feats of mountainous flight."

Alternate version
The 3D version, "The Art of FLIGHT 3D", premiered at the San Sebastián Film Festival in Spain on September 28, 2012.

Soundtrack
The Art of Flight soundtrack features songs by: The Naked and Famous, M83, Deadmau5, Sigur Rós, and others.

References

External links
The Art of Flight official film site

2011 documentary films
2011 films
American sports documentary films
Red Bull
Snowboarding
Films shot in British Columbia
Films shot in Chile
Films shot in Alaska
Films shot in Wyoming
Films shot in Colorado
2010s English-language films
2010s American films